R. Walther Darré was a German fishing trawler that was requisitioned by the Kriegsmarine in the Second World War for use as a Vorpostenboot. She served as V 210 R. Walther Darré and V 208 R. Walther Darré. She was sunk in the English Channel by  British motor torpedo boats in July 1944.

Description
The engine was made by Deschimag Seebeckwerft, Wesermünde. It was rated at 115nhp. The engine powered a single screw propeller driven via a geared low pressure turbine.

History
The ship was built as yard number 506 by Deschimag Seekbeckwerft, Wesermünde for the Nordsee Deutsche Hochseefischerei Bremen-Cuxhaven AG. She was launched in July 1933 and completed on 23 August. The fishing boat registration HC 273 was allocated. From 1934, she was allocated the Code Letters DJMC. R. Walther Darré took part in the Festungkriegsübung Swinemünde naval exercises on 10 June 1937.

R. Walther Darré was requisitioned by the Kriegsmarine on 28 September 1939 for use as a vorpostenboot. She was allocated to 2 Vorpostenflotille as V 210 R. Walther Darré. On 20 October she was redesignated V 208 R. Walther Darré. On 27 August 1942, she was attacked and sunk by Allied aircraft at Dieppe, Seine-Inférieure, France. She was refloated, repaired and returned to service. On 4 July 1944, she was sunk in the English Channel by the motor torpedo boats HMMTB 734, HMMTB 735, HMMTB 743 and HMMTB 748 of the Royal Navy. V 210 Hinrich Hey was also sunk in the battle. V 209 Dr. Rudolf Wahrendorff and the minesweeper  were damaged.

References

Sources

1933 ships
Ships built in Bremen (state)
Fishing vessels of Germany
World War II merchant ships of Germany
Auxiliary ships of the Kriegsmarine
Maritime incidents in August 1942
Maritime incidents in July 1944
Ships sunk by aircraft
World War II shipwrecks in the English Channel